Election bellwether counties in the United States are counties that vote in alignment with the country as a whole in United States presidential elections, so that the county votes for the candidate who ultimately wins the election. The strongest bellwether counties are those that back the winning candidate in all elections. There are a total of 3,142 counties or county equivalents in the United States.

Significant bellwethers
The following county is the only county to have voted for the winner of the presidential election in every election starting in 1980:
 Clallam County, Washington

Deviations in one election
The following 44 counties have deviated from the winner of the presidential election in one election since 1980 (no counties deviated from the winner in 1980, 1984, or 1996):

Deviations in two elections
The following 111 counties have deviated from the winner of the presidential election in two elections since 1980:

 Allamakee County, Iowa, in 1992 and 2020
 Alamosa County, Colorado, in 2016 and 2020
 Baldwin County, Georgia, in 1980 and 2016
 Benzie County, Michigan, in 2012 and 2020
 Blue Earth County, Minnesota, in 1988 and 2004
 Brewster County, Texas, in 2012 and 2020
 Bureau County, Illinois, in 2012 and 2020
 Butte County, California, in 1996 and 2012
 Caddo Parish, Louisiana, in 2000 and 2016
 Caledonia County, Vermont, in 2004 and 2016
 Calhoun County, Michigan, in 2000 and 2020
 Calhoun County, South Carolina, in 1980 and 2020
 Cascade County, Montana, in 2012 and 2020
 Cass County, Michigan, in 2012 and 2020
 Chesapeake, Virginia, in 1992 and 1996
 Chickasaw County, Mississippi, in 1980 and 2020
 Clark County, Washington, in 1988 and 2016
 Clear Creek County, Colorado, in 2004 and 2016
 Coles County, Illinois, in 2012 and 2020
 Colleton County, South Carolina, in 1980 and 2020
 Columbia County, Wisconsin, in 2000 and 2020
 Coös County, New Hampshire, in 2004 and 2020
 Cayuga County, New York, in 2000 and 2020 
 Chautauqua County, New York, in 2012 and 2020
 Delaware County, Indiana, in 1992 and 2020
 Dutchess County, New York, in 1992 and 2016
 Eagle County, Colorado, in 2004 and 2016
 East Baton Rouge Parish, Louisiana, in 1992 and 2016
 Elk County, Pennsylvania, in 2012 and 2020
 Essex County, Virginia, in 1992 and 2020
 Fayette County, Kentucky, in 1992 and 2016
 Fresno County, California, in 1996 and 2016 
 Gladwin County, Michigan, in 2012 and 2020
 Gloucester County, New Jersey, in 2000 and 2004
 Grand County, Utah, in 1996 and 2012
 Guilford County, North Carolina, in 2004 and 2016
 Gunnison County, Colorado, in 2004 and 2016
 Hill County, Montana, in 1988 and 2020
 Hillsborough County, Florida, in 1992 and 2016
 Houston County, Minnesota, in 1992 and 2020
 Island County, Washington, in 1996 and 2016
 Jefferson County, Iowa, in 2004 and 2020
 Jo Daviess County, Illinois, in 1992 and 2020
 Kankakee County, Illinois, in 2012 and 2020
 Kennebec County, Maine, in 2000 and 2004
 Lake County, Illinois, in 1992 and 2016
 Larimer County, Colorado, in 1996 and 2016
 Latah County, Idaho, in 1988 and 2016
 Lenawee County, Michigan, in 2012 and 2020
 Lincoln County, Maine, in 2004 and 2016
 Lincoln County, Wisconsin, in 1988 and 2020
 Luna County, New Mexico, in 2012 and 2020
 Madison County, New York, 1992 and 2020
 Manistee County, Michigan, in 2000 and 2020
 Marion County, Oregon, in 1992 and 2012
 Marshall County, Iowa, in 1988 and 2020
 Marshall County, South Dakota, in 1988 and 2020
 Mason County, Illinois, in 2012 and 2020
 McDonough County, Illinois, in 2012 and 2020
 Menominee County, Michigan, in 2012 and 2020
 Monroe County, Indiana, in 2004 and 2016
 Monroe County, Michigan, in 2000 and 2020
 Monroe County, Wisconsin, in 2012 and 2020
 Montgomery County, Virginia, in 2012 and 2016
 Northampton County, Pennsylvania, in 2000 and 2004.
 Oconto County, Wisconsin, in 2012 and 2020
 Oneida County, Wisconsin, in 2012 and 2020
 Orange County, New York, in 1992 and 2020
 Orange County, Vermont, in 2004 and 2016
 Orleans County, Vermont, in 2004 and 2016
 Oswego County, New York, in 1992 and 2020
 Penobscot County, Maine, in 2004 and 2020
 Pike County, Mississippi, in 1980 and 2016
 Pitt County, North Carolina, in 1996 and 2016
 Porter County, Indiana, in 1992 and 2020
 Presque Isle County, Michigan, in 2012 and 2020
 Racine County, Wisconsin, in 1988 and 2020
 Radford, Virginia, in 1980 and 2016
 Ransom County, North Dakota, in 1988 and 2020
 Rensselaer County, New York, in 2000 and 2004 
 Riverside County, California, in 1996 and 2016 
 Rockingham County, New Hampshire, in 1992 and 2012 
 Rockland County, New York, in 2000 and 2016
 Routt County, Colorado, in 2004 and 2016
 Sandusky County, Ohio, in 1992 and 2020
 San Diego County, California, in 1996 and 2016 
 San Luis Obispo County, California, in 1996 and 2016 
 Sargent County, North Dakota, in 1988 and 2020
 Sauk County, Wisconsin, in 2000 and 2004. 
 Schuyler County, Illinois, in 2012 and 2020
 Seneca County, New York, in 2000 and 2020
 Spencer County, Indiana, in 2012 and 2020
 St. Joseph County, Indiana, in 2000 and 2016
 Stark County, Ohio, in 2004 and 2020
 Starke County, Indiana, in 2012 and 2020
 Sullivan County, New York, in 2000 and 2020
 Sumter County, Georgia, in 1980 and 2016
 Teton County, Wyoming, in 2004 and 2016
 Traverse County, Minnesota, in 1988 and 2020
 Tuscarawas County, Ohio, in 2012 and 2020
 Union County, Iowa, in 1988 and 2020
 Val Verde County, Texas, in 2016 and 2020
 Vanderburgh County, Indiana, in 2012 and 2020
 Wake County, North Carolina, in 1996 and 2016
 Warren County, New York, in 1992 and 2020
 Washington County, New York, in 1992 and 2020
 Watonwan County, Minnesota, in 2012 and 2020
 Whitman County, Washington, in 2012 and 2016
 Williamsburg, Virginia, in 2004 and 2016
 Winnebago County, Wisconsin, in 1992 and 2020
 Winona County, Minnesota, in 2000 and 2004

Notes

References

Elections in the United States
Election bellwether